Hasan Salaran (also Romanized as Ḩasan Sālārān) is a village in Zu ol Faqr Rural District, Sarshiv District, Saqqez County, Kurdistan Province, Iran. At the 2006 census, its population was 182, in 35 families. The village is populated by Kurds.

References 

Towns and villages in Saqqez County